Ross John Gardiner (born 30 December 1986) is a Scottish footballer who plays in central defence/left back and is currently not signed.

Career
Gardiner was born in Bellshill, North Lanarkshire, but grew up in the Aberdeen area (his father John was also a footballer who played as a goalkeeper, and then managed teams in the Highland League). He trained with Aberdeen prior to joining Dundee United's youth system, initially as an under-14 player. After turning professional in 2003, Gardiner became a regular in United's youth team and subsequently the reserve side. Having previously been listed as a substitute for the first team, he was given his debut in an SPL match away to Inverness Caledonian Thistle in April 2006. After failing to make an impact at United, Gardiner was released from the club in May 2007 and joined Montrose in time for the 2007-08 season, leaving the club two years later. Gardiner then moved to Australia to play for Bentleigh Greens, however he returned home due to injury at the end of the season.

References

External links 
 

1986 births
Living people
Footballers from Aberdeen
Scottish footballers
Association football defenders
Dundee United F.C. players
Arbroath F.C. players
Montrose F.C. players
Scottish Premier League players
Scottish Football League players
Scottish expatriate footballers
Expatriate soccer players in Australia
Scotland youth international footballers